La cantante scalza - Sandie Shaw canta in italiano is an album by the British singer Sandie Shaw, and features a compilation of her hits recorded in the Italian language. It was released by EMI in 2003.

Track listing

 "Il mondo nei tuoi occhi" ("(There's) Always Something There to Remind Me")
 "E ti avrò" ("Girl Don't Come")
 "Viva l'amore con te" ("Long Live Love")
 "Quello che tu cerchi amica" ("Stop Feeling Sorry for Yourself")
 "Che ragazzo matto" ("Message Understood")
 "RDomani" ("Tomorrow")
 "Pochi sorrisi" ("Nothing Comes Easy")
 "Stop li dove stai" ("Stop Before You Start")
 "Guardo te che te ne vai"
 "La danza delle note" ("Puppet on a String")
 "Ho sognato te" ("Had a Dream Last Night")
 "Lo vuole lui, lo vuole lei"
 "E lui"
 "Come nei film"
 "Due anni piu di me" ("You've Not Changed")
 "Oggi" ("Today")
 "Love Me, Please Love Me"
 "Se mai" ("Smile")
 "Quelli erano i giorni" ("Those Were the Days")
 "Com'è bella la sera" (closing song in television show Controfatica)
 "Papà Dupont" ("Monsieur Dupont")
 "Ma guarda un po' chi c'è" ("Voice in the Crowd")
 "Pupazzo di legno"
 "Tante parole" ("Send Me a Letter")
 "Un battito d'ali" (closing song in radio show "Gran Varietà")
 "Che effetto mi fa" (song presented in Sanremo Festival contest 1970)

Sandie Shaw albums
2003 compilation albums
EMI Records compilation albums